Eremophila pterocarpa, commonly known as silver poverty bush or winged-fruited eremophila, is a plant in the figwort family, Scrophulariaceae and is endemic to Western Australia. It is a densely foliaged, upright shrub with most of its parts covered with a silvery powder.

Description
The leaves lack a stalk and are crowded together, linear to lance-shaped with a pointed end. The leaves and stems are covered with powder-like short, matted hairs.

There are 5 sepals which are narrow egg-shaped to triangular and of approximately equal lengths. As with the leaves, the sepals and petals have a dusty covering of short, fine hairs. Flowering occurs between June and September and is followed by fruits which are flattened and dry with papery wings.

Taxonomy and naming
The species was first formally described in 1904 by William Vincent Fitzgerald in the Journal of the Royal Society of Western Australia. The specific epithet  pterocarpa is from the Ancient Greek πτερόν (pterón) meaning “wing" or "feather” and καρπός (karpós) meaning “fruit" or "grain” referring to the winged fruits.

Subspecies
The following subspecies have been described by Robert Chinnock:

Distribution and habitat
Eremophila pterocarpa subsp. pterocarpa occurs in and between the Cape Range, Shark Bay and Meekatharra areas where it grows in sandy clay or soils derived from limestone, in flats or salty sites. Eremophila pterocarpa subsp. acicularis is found between Wiluna and the pastoral leases Neds Creek and Earaheedy, where it grows in more rocky, saline sites.

Conservation
Both subspecies of silver poverty bush are listed as "not threatened" by the Government of Western Australia Department of Parks and Wildlife.

Use in horticulture
The silvery-grey foliage and winged fruit are attractive features of this shrub as are the dusky pink to red flowers. It is a hardy plant and some in cultivation are more than 30 years old. It can be propagated from cuttings or by grafting onto Myoporum species and will grow in a wide range of soils, including saline, alkaline, or clay soils. In nature it is subject to long droughts and occasional flooding and this watering regime will encourage its flowering. It is also tolerant of frosts and of hard pruning when mature.

References

Eudicots of Western Australia
pterocarpa
Plants described in 1904
Taxa named by William Vincent Fitzgerald